Võduvere is a village in Kadrina Parish, Lääne-Viru County, in north-eastern Estonia. It lies on the left bank of the Loobu River, just south-west of Kadrina, the administrative centre of the municipality.

References

 

Villages in Lääne-Viru County
Kreis Wierland